Mieczysław Mümler (10 December 18995 September 1985) was a Polish fighter ace of the Polish Air Force in World War II with 5 confirmed kills and one shared.

Biography
Mieczysław Mümler was born in Lwów in 1899. In November 1918 he fought as one of Lwów Eaglets and was wounded in combat. In February 1919 he was assigned to a Legions Field Artillery Regiment. He took part in the Greater Poland Uprising (1918–19). Three years later he was graduated from the Cadets Artillery School and was commissioned as a 2nd lieutenant.

In 1926 he applied for a transfer to the Air Force which was accepted. He completed pilot training in a Fighter Regiment in Lida. In 1929 he took command of a fighter escadrille in Poznań. He was an instructor in the High Aviation School in Grudziądz.

During the September Campaign Mümler commanded the III/3 Fighter Squadron, on 6 September he shot down his first enemy plane, a He 111, six days later he shot down another Heinkel and a Hs 126. He was evacuated to France via Romania. In the Battle of France he flew a Dewoitine D.520, on 1 June he shot down a He 111 and on 15 June he scored a shared victory on a Do 17.

Upon the fall of France he flew across the Mediterranean to North Africa, and then via Casablanca and Gibraltar reached Britain.  He received service no. P-1288. He was appointed to organise and command No. 302 Polish Fighter Squadron, with which he took part in the Battle of Britain. On 18 September 1940 he shot down a Do 215. In February 1941 he became commander of the 58 Operational Training Unit then of the 55 OTU. In September 1942 he was given command of the Polish Station in Northolt. He occasionally flew on operations with the wing (on 3 February 1943 he damaged a Fw 190).

Mieczysław Mümler was demobilized in 1946. He settled in London where he worked as a baker. He died on 5 September 1985.

Aerial victory credits
 He 111 - 6 September 1939
 He 111 - 12 September 1939
 Hs 126 - 12 September 1939
 1/2 He 111 - Battle of France (damaged)
 He 111 - 1 June 1940
 1/2 Do 17 – 15 June 1940
 Do 215 (Do 17) - 18 September 1940
 Fw 190 - 3 February 1943 (damaged)

Awards
 Virtuti Militari, Silver Cross 
 Croix de Guerre

References

Further reading
 Tadeusz Jerzy Krzystek, Anna Krzystek: Polskie Siły Powietrzne w Wielkiej Brytanii w latach 1940-1947 łącznie z Pomocniczą Lotniczą Służbą Kobiet (PLSK-WAAF). Sandomierz: Stratus, 2012, s. 405. .
 Piotr Sikora: Asy polskiego lotnictwa. Warszawa: Oficyna Wydawnicza Alma-Press. 2014, s. 338-344. .
 Józef Zieliński: Asy polskiego lotnictwa. Warszawa: Agencja lotnicza ALTAIR, 1994, s. 49. ISBN 83862172. 
 Józef Zieliński: Lotnicy polscy w Bitwie o Wielką Brytanię. Warszawa: Oficyna Wydawnicza MH, 2005, s. 137-138.

External links
 
 
 

The Few
Polish World War II flying aces
Recipients of the Silver Cross of the Virtuti Militari
1985 deaths
1899 births
Recipients of the Croix de Guerre (France)